The Homorodul Mic is the left headwater of the river Homorod in Romania. At its confluence with the river Homorodul Mare in the village Homorod, the river Homorod is formed. It flows through the villages and towns Căpâlnița, Vlăhița, Lueta, Merești, Crăciunel, Ocland, Satu Nou, Jimbor, Mercheașa and Homorod.

References

Rivers of Romania
Rivers of Brașov County
Rivers of Harghita County